Heman Gurung (born 27 February 1996) is a Nepalese international footballer who plays as a midfielder for Himalayan Sherpa Club and the Nepal national football team.

Early life and career
Gurung made headlines in India when, in 2010, he scored 9 goals in a 25–0 victory over the Lakshadweep Government High School for his own school, the Takshashila Academy. He has played for the Himalayan Sherpa Club since at least 2013.

International career
Gurung has represented Nepal at under-17, under-22 and senior level; making his full debut in a 1–0 loss to Bangladesh in 2015. His first taste of competitive international football came in the 2015 SAFF Championship, where he played in matches against Sri Lanka and India.

International

References

External links
 
 

1996 births
Living people
Nepalese footballers
Nepal international footballers
Association football midfielders
Footballers at the 2018 Asian Games
Asian Games competitors for Nepal
Footballers at the 2014 Asian Games
Gurung people